Helmut Knocke (born 1953) is a German architecture historian and author.

Life
Hemut Knocke studied architecture, with a special focus on the history of building, at the Leibniz University Hannover (LUH) in his home city, Hannover, graduating in 1983. He has worked for the Cultural heritage inventarisation department where  the focus of his work was on the built and documentary legacies of the architects Georg Ludwig Friedrich Laves (1788–1864) and Rudolf Hillebrecht (1910–1999). He also involved himself in research projects at the Institute for Arts and Buildings History at LUH.

He has contributed many of the entries in the Hannover Biographical lexicon, and to the Hannover City Lexicon.

References

Architectural historians
Architects from Hanover
1953 births
Living people